The Secretariat of Health (Spanish: Secretaría de Salud) is the government department in charge of all social health services in Mexico, and an integral part of the Mexican health system. The Secretary of Health is a member of the Executive Cabinet and is appointed at the discretion of the President of the Republic.

In recent years, the Secretary of Health has played a more restricted role, as many of its functions have been transferred to the corresponding institutions of the individual Mexican States.

List of recent Secretaries of Health

The sociologist Asa Cristina Laurell is a former Undersecretary of Integration and Development at the Secretariat.

See also
Salvador Zubirán National Institute of Health Sciences and Nutrition

References

External links
http://salud_2013.salud.gob.mx/ (in Spanish)
Federal Commission for the Protection against Sanitary Risk (in Spanish)

Mexico, Secretariat of Health
Health, Secretariat of

1938 establishments in Mexico
Health